Islam Kurbanovich Magomedov; born 8 February 1991 in Makhachkala) is a Russian Greco-Roman wrestler of Dargin descent. He is a two-time Junior Greco-Roman World Champion and Gold Medalist at the 2015 Russian National Greco-Roman Wrestling Championships. On 12 June, 2015 he won gold medal at the European Games 2015, defeating Ukrainian Dimitriy Timchenko in the final. In the same year Magomedov won bronze medal at the 2015 World Wrestling Championships. Magomedov is International Master of Sports in Greco-Roman Wrestling. He competed at Olympics 2016, but lost in the quarterfinals.

References

External links
 

1991 births
Avar people
Living people
Russian male sport wrestlers
Sportspeople from Makhachkala
European Games gold medalists for Russia
European Games medalists in wrestling
Wrestlers at the 2015 European Games
World Wrestling Championships medalists
Wrestlers at the 2016 Summer Olympics
Olympic wrestlers of Russia
20th-century Russian people
21st-century Russian people